Events in the year 1907 in India.

Incumbents
 Emperor of India – Edward VII
 Viceroy of India – Gilbert Elliot-Murray-Kynynmound, 4th Earl of Minto

Events
 National income - 11,653 million
 5 June – Bochasanwasi Shri Akshar Purushottam Swaminarayan Sanstha, a sect of Hinduism, is established by Swami Yagnapurushdas.
 26 December – Surat Split of Congress- Split into Moderates and Radicals- Resulted in political void and arresting of Radical leaders

Law
Provincial Insolvency Act

Births
1 April – Sree Sree Shivakumara Swamiji, Head of Siddaganga Mutt and founder of Sree Siddaganga Education Society (died 2019)
15 May – Sukhdev Thapar, revolutionary, executed (died 1931).
19 August – Hazari Prasad Dwivedi, novelist, literary historian, essayist, critic and scholar (died 1979).
27 September – Bhagat Singh, freedom fighter, executed (died 1931).

Full date unknown
Krishna Hutheesing, political activist and writer (died 1967).

References

 
India
Years of the 20th century in India